Chahar Tang-e Olya (also Romanized as Chahār Tang-e ‘Olyā and Chahār Tang ‘Olyā; also known as Chahār Tang-e Bālā) is a village in Howmeh-ye Sharqi Rural District, in the Central District of Izeh County, Khuzestan Province, Iran. At the 2006 census, its population was 488, in 83 families.

References 

Populated places in Izeh County